The Year the Yankees Lost the Pennant is a 1954 novel by Douglass Wallop.  It adapts the Faust theme of a deal with the Devil to the world of American baseball in the 1950s.

Plot summary
The novel's protagonist, mild-mannered, middle-aged Joe Boyd, is depicted as a lifelong fan of the hapless Washington Senators.  As the novel begins, the Senators are losing ground in the American League to their longtime nemesis, the New York Yankees.

The discouraged Boyd runs into an unexpected offer from a fast-talking confidence man, who introduces himself as "Mr. Applegate."  "Applegate" offers to transform Joe Boyd into Joe Hardy, a young baseball superstar, and facilitate his signing with the Senators' front office so that Hardy can help salvage the Senators' lost season.  Boyd, suspicious, negotiates with "Applegate" and extracts a promise that the transformation will only be temporary and, after helping the Senators win a suitable number of games, Hardy will be able to re-transfer himself back to his Joe Boyd personality.

The transformation takes place, Hardy joins the Senators, and all begins to develop as "Applegate" had predicted.  However, the new baseball superstar begins to realize that his deal with "Applegate" may not be so temporary and he may have let himself in for more than he had expected.  As Hardy's doubts grow over his predicament, "Applegate" presents Hardy with love interest Lola, depicted as a glamorous temptress in the style of the 1950s.

Adaptations
The novel was adapted into the 1955 musical Damn Yankees. The musical's book was written by George Abbott and Douglass Wallop; its music and lyrics were written by Richard Adler and Jerry Ross.  The musical starred Ray Walston as Applegate,  Stephen Douglass as Joe Hardy and Gwen Verdon as Lola.

The 1958 film adaptation featured Tab Hunter as Joe. Hunter was the sole actor who had not been in the stage play.

Reception
Anthony Boucher dismissed the novel as "just another Pact-with-the-Devil story, somewhat brightened by its Major League baseball setting."

See also

 Deal with the Devil
 Deals with the Devil in popular culture

References

1954 American novels
1954 fantasy novels
Baseball novels
Works about the New York Yankees
American fantasy novels adapted into films
Washington Senators (1901–1960)
Works based on the Faust legend
Dark fantasy novels
Fiction about the Devil